No. 18 (Pilots) Advanced Flying Unit was formed on 27 October 1942 at RAF Church Lawford. The unit was previously 2 Central Flying School which was founded on 15 June 1941 which then turned into 1 Flying Instructors School (FIS) on 13 January 1942 and then finally No. 18 (P)AFU.

Bases used
 RAF Church Lawford from 27 October 1942
 RAF Snitterfield firstly as a relief landing ground (RLG) from 7 May 1944 until 3  April 1945 then permanently until the unit disbanded on 29 May 1945.
 RAF Warwick
 RAF Southam
 RAF Hockley Heath.

Aircraft operated
The majority of the flying training took place using an Airspeed Oxford, which was good, as most of the students had come from overseas training programs where they were mainly using single-engined airplanes. However Boulton Paul Defiants and Miles Magisters  were also used.

See also

References

Citations

Bibliography

Training units and formations of the Royal Air Force
Aviation schools
Military units and formations of the Royal Air Force in World War II